The Unusual Past of Thea Carter (German: Die seltsame Vergangenheit der Thea Carter) is a 1929 German silent film directed by Ernst Laemmle and Joseph Levigard and starring Olaf Fønss, June Marlowe and Inge Landgut.

The film's art direction was by Franz Schroedter.

Cast
 Olaf Fønss as Direktor Carter
 June Marlowe as Thea Carter
 Inge Landgut as Inge Carter
 Olga Engl as Oma Carter
 Ernst Stahl-Nachbaur as Van Ruyten
 Hermann Vallentin as Polizeirat Kroll
 Camilla von Hollay as Die Zofe
 Charles Charlia as Charlie Mason

References

Bibliography
 Goble, Alan. The Complete Index to Literary Sources in Film. Walter de Gruyter, 1999.

External links

1929 films
Films of the Weimar Republic
German silent feature films
Films directed by Ernst Laemmle
Universal Pictures films
German black-and-white films